Zoar is an unincorporated community in Pike and Dubois counties, in the U.S. state of Indiana.

History
A church at Zoar was built in 1871, and its schoolhouse was built in 1897. A post office was established at Zoar in 1900, and remained in operation until it was discontinued in 1907. The community was likely named after Zoar, Ohio.

Geography

References

Unincorporated communities in Dubois County, Indiana
Unincorporated communities in Pike County, Indiana
Unincorporated communities in Indiana